The BNP Paribas Primrose Bordeaux is a professional tennis tournament played on outdoor red clay courts. It is currently part of the Association of Tennis Professionals (ATP) Challenger Tour. It is held annually at the Villa Primrose in Bordeaux, France, since 2008.

Marc Gicquel was the only player to win two singles titles (no doubles title similar case so far). Martin Kližan won both singles and double titles the same year.

Past finals

Singles

Doubles

External links
Official website

 
ATP Challenger Tour
Clay court tennis tournaments
Tennis tournaments in France
Sport in Bordeaux
Recurring sporting events established in 2008
2008 establishments in France